Linda Wallem (born May 29, 1961) is an American actress, writer, and producer.

Early life
Wallem was born in Madison, Wisconsin, and raised in Rockford, Illinois. She is the older sister of actor Stephen Wallem who co-stars on her show Nurse Jackie as a nurse named Thor Lundgren.

Career

Early career
Wallem began her career at Dudley Riggs' Brave New Workshop in Minneapolis, Minnesota. She and fellow writer-performer Peter Tolan formed a double act called Wallem & Tolan and began performing on the cabaret circuit in New York City at such venues as the Manhattan Punch Line.  Broadway veteran Martin Charnin caught the act at the behest of producers Sanford Fisher and Zev Guber and worked with the duo to present it as an Off Broadway called Laughing Matters in 1989.

Acting
Wallem appeared in the 1993 film Sleepless in Seattle as the waitress from whom star Meg Ryan's character buys tea on the road. On Seinfeld Wallem played Hildy, the waitress who refuses to serve Elaine Benes her customary "big salad" in the 1994 episode "The Soup." Young viewers are likely to recognize her voice as Doctor Paula Hutchison, Virginia Wolfe and other female characters on the Nickelodeon animated television series, Rocko's Modern Life (1993–1996). She returned to voice Hutchison and other characters in the 2019 Netflix special Rocko's Modern Life: Static Cling.

Writing and producing
Wallem wrote for the Cybill Shepherd television situation comedy Cybill during its entire run from 1995 to 1998, also occasionally acting on the series. She then wrote for the sitcom That '70s Show from 1998 to 2000, serving as executive producer from 2000 to 2001 and then executive producing That '80s Show in 2002.

In 2007, Wallem and Liz Brixius created and produced a pilot called Insatiable for Showtime which was not picked up. In 2008, the duo (with writer Evan Dunsky) created the series Nurse Jackie, a half-hour drama about a "flawed" emergency room nurse in a New York City hospital. Starring Edie Falco of The Sopranos, the series premiered on Showtime in June 2009, with Wallem and Brixius serving as showrunners for the series and sharing executive producer duties with Caryn Mandabach.

Personal life
Wallem married singer Melissa Etheridge on May 31, 2014, in San Ysidro Ranch in Montecito, California, two days after they both turned 53.

References

External links
 

1961 births
20th-century American actresses
21st-century American actresses
20th-century American screenwriters
21st-century American screenwriters
20th-century American women writers
21st-century American women writers
American television actresses
Television producers from Illinois
American women television producers
American television writers
Living people
Actors from Madison, Wisconsin
American women television writers
American lesbian actresses
American LGBT screenwriters
LGBT television producers
Writers from Madison, Wisconsin
Showrunners
Writers from Rockford, Illinois
Actors from Rockford, Illinois
LGBT people from Illinois
LGBT people from Wisconsin
Screenwriters from Illinois
Screenwriters from Wisconsin
American lesbian writers
American voice actresses